

Area codes

Mobile phones

Special service numbers

References

ITU allocation list
 Numbering plan at International Numbering Plans

Turkmenistan
Telephone numbers